eGovernment factsheets are periodical publications which aim to promote good practice sharing among countries of Europe in the field of delivering electronic services to the benefit of Public Administrations, Businesses and Citizens.

Published biannually, eGovernment factsheets provide a detailed monitoring of the latest eGovernment developments in 34 European countries (EU-27, Croatia, North Macedonia, Turkey, Iceland, Liechtenstein, Norway and Switzerland) and offer insight and a point of reference for eGovernment practitioners across Europe.

Since December 2014 the factsheets are published on Joinup's National Interoperability Framework Observatory, before that, the factsheets were a part of the European Commission’s information and communication policy for the ePractice.eu initiative.

The factsheets pose as an information hub about the progress being made both on a national and European level in the field of eGovernment services, structured in the following sections:
 Country Profile: Basic data, indicators and eGovernment State of Play 
 eGovernment History: Main historic developments and key milestones
 eGovernment Strategy: Main strategic objectives, principles  and visions
 eGovernment Legal Framework: Main legal texts which are impacting the development of eGovernment 
 eGovernment Actors: Main roles and responsibilities within national, regional and local governmental bodies
 eGovernment Who's Who: The main eGovernment decision-makers and executives 
 eGovernment Infrastructure: The main eGovernment infrastructure components 
 eGovernment Services for Citizens
 eGovernment Services for Businesses

References

External links 
 NIFO Community - eGovernment factsheets on Joinup.eu
 GEOMunicipal - Local eGovernment Factsheets

Politics and technology